The 1992–93 Gonzaga Bulldogs men's basketball team represented Gonzaga University in the West Coast Conference (WCC) during the 1992–93 NCAA Division I men's basketball season. Led by eleventh-year head coach Dan Fitzgerald, the Bulldogs were  overall in the regular season (10–4 in WCC, second), and played their home games on campus at the Charlotte Y. Martin Centre in Spokane, Washington.

Gonzaga advanced to the semifinals of the WCC tournament at San Francisco, but lost to third seed and eventual champion  Santa Clara to finish at

Postseason results

|-
!colspan=6 style=| WCC tournament

References

External links
Sports Reference – Gonzaga Bulldogs men's basketball – 1992–93 season

Gonzaga Bulldogs men's basketball seasons
Gonzaga
1992 in sports in Washington (state)
1993 in sports in Washington (state)